Church of St. Joseph the Betrothed is a demolished Roman Catholic church in Vilnius' Old Town, which previously was located in Arklių St. The church was established in 1638 by the Vice-Chancellor of the Grand Duchy of Lithuania Stefan Pac and was used by the Carmelites. In 1877 the Church of St. Joseph the Betrothed was demolished by the tsar's order, to be replaced by a market (presently it is a square).

Gallery

References

Roman Catholic churches completed in 1668
17th-century Roman Catholic church buildings in Lithuania
Baroque architecture in Lithuania
Roman Catholic churches in Vilnius
1668 establishments in the Polish–Lithuanian Commonwealth
Destroyed churches in Lithuania